In the Mykonos restaurant assassinations (also the "Mykonos Incident"), Iranian-Kurdish opposition leaders Sadegh Sharafkandi, Fattah Abdoli, Homayoun Ardalan and their translator Nouri Dehkordi, were assassinated at the Mykonos Greek restaurant in Berlin, Germany on 17 September 1992. The assassination took place during the KDPI insurgency (1989–96), as part of the general Kurdish separatism in Iran. The assassins were believed by German courts to have links to Iranian intelligence.

Events

Sharafkandi, Abdoli, Ardalan and Dehkordi were murdered in a mafia-style attack at the Mykonos Greek restaurant located on Prager Strasse in Berlin at about 11 pm on 17 September 1992. Three victims died instantly, while the fourth died at a hospital. In the same restaurant a meeting was scheduled of Ingvar Carlsson, a two-term Prime Minister of Sweden and leader of the Swedish Social Democratic Party, Mona Sahlin, the secretary of the Swedish Social Democratic Party and Pierre Schori, the former Swedish State Secretary for Foreign Affairs. Due to a telephone call to Ingvar Carlsson from Carl Bildt, the then-current Prime Minister of Sweden, who urged Carlsson to immediately return to Sweden due to the alleged urgent state of the Swedish economy, all three flew back to Sweden the same day and thus probably escaped being assassinated as well.

Sharafkandi, Abdoli and Ardalan were buried in the Père Lachaise Cemetery, in Paris.

Trial
The trial began in October 1993. In the trial the German court found Kazem Darabi, an Iranian who worked as a grocer in Berlin, Abdolraham Banihashemi, an Iranian intelligence officer, and Lebanese Abbas Hossein Rhayel, guilty of murder and sentenced them to life in prison. Two other Lebanese, Youssef Amin and Mohamed Atris, were convicted of being accessories to murder. A dissident ex-President of Iran Abolhassan Banisadr, who fled the country in 1981 after being impeached and has not returned since, testified as a witness during the trial and told the court that the killings had been personally ordered by Ayatollah Ali Khamenei and then-president Ali Akbar Hashemi Rafsanjani. There was also a getaway driver named Farajollah Haider (also known as Abu Ja'far).

Iranian officials, however, categorically denied their involvement in the incident. The then-speaker of the Iranian Parliament Ali Akbar Nategh-Nouri dismissed the ruling as being political, untrue and unsubstantiated.

In its 10 April 1997 ruling, the court issued an international arrest warrant for Iranian intelligence minister Ali Fallahian after declaring that the assassination had been ordered by him with knowledge of Khamenei and Rafsanjani. This led to a diplomatic crisis between the government of Iran and those of several European countries lasting until November 1997. Despite international and domestic protests, Darabi and Rhayel were released from prison on 10 December 2007 and deported back to their home countries.

Adaptations in media
The events surrounding the Mykonos restaurant assassinations and subsequent trial were adapted into a non-fiction story by Roya Hakakian in her book Assassins of the Turquoise Palace in 2011.

The Mykonos restaurant assassinations (alongside the 1994 AMIA bombing) are attributed to Majid Javadi in Episode One of Season Three in the 2011 American TV show Homeland

See also
Germany–Iran relations
Iran and state-sponsored terrorism
Chain murders of Iran
Kurdistan Democratic Party of Iran

References

External links
"Holy Crime" A Documentary by Reza Allamehzadeh about the assassinations (English version on YouTube)
A detailed report on the assassinations Iran Human Rights Documentation Center

Terrorist incidents in Germany
Germany–Iran relations
1992 in Berlin
Attacks on restaurants in Europe
Murder in Berlin
Kurdish separatism in Iran
Assassinations in Germany
September 1992 events in Europe
Attacks on buildings and structures in Germany
20th-century mass murder in Germany
Mass murder in 1992
1992 murders in Germany
Terrorist incidents in Germany in 1992
People killed in Ministry of Intelligence (Iran) operations
1990s murders in Berlin